Zuphium is a genus of beetles in the family Carabidae, containing the following species:

 Zuphium aequinoctiale Chaudoir, 1862 
 Zuphium americanum Dejean, 1831 
 Zuphium araxidis Iablokoff-Khnzorian, 1972 
 Zuphium argentinicum Liebke, 1933 
 Zuphium ascendens Alluaud, 1917 
 Zuphium australe Chaudoir, 1862 
 Zuphium batesi Chaudoir, 1862 
 Zuphium bedeli Vauloger De Beaupre, 1897 
 Zuphium bierigi Liebke, 1933 
 Zuphium bimaculatum Schmidt-Goebel, 1846 
 Zuphium bohemani Chaudoir, 1862 
 Zuphium brasiliense Chaudoir, 1872
 Zuphium bruchi Liebke, 1933 
 Zuphium brunneum Boheman, 1848 
 Zuphium caffrum Boheman, 1848 
 Zuphium castelnaui Gestro, 1875 
 Zuphium celebense Chaudoir, 1862 
 Zuphium ciliatum Vauloger De Beaupre, 1897 
 Zuphium cilicium Peyron, 1858
 Zuphium coarctatum Basilewsky, 1962 
 Zuphium columbianum Chaudoir, 1872 
 Zuphium congoense Basilewsky, 1962 
 Zuphium cubanum Liebke, 1933 
 Zuphium dabreui Andrewes, 1922 
 Zuphium delectum Liebke, 1933 
 Zuphium erebeum Andrewes, 1923 
 Zuphium erythrocephalum Chaudoir, 1862 
 Zuphium exiguum Putzeys, 1878 
 Zuphium exquisitum Liebke, 1933 
 Zuphium flavum Baehr, 2001 
 Zuphium fleurasi Gory, 1833 
 Zuphium flohri Liebke, 1933 
 Zuphium formosum Bates, 1892 
 Zuphium fuscum Gory, 1831 E
 Zuphium haitianum Darlington, 1935 
 Zuphium hungaricum J.Frivaldszky, 1877 
 Zuphium indicum Andrewes, 1922 
 Zuphium juengeri Mateu, 1995 
 Zuphium juratulum Basilewsky, 1960 
 Zuphium lecordieri Basilewsky, 1968 
 Zuphium lizeri Liebke, 1933 
 Zuphium longicolle Leconte, 1879 
 Zuphium macleayanum Baehr, 1986 
 Zuphium maculiceps Fairmaire, 1899 
 Zuphium magnum Schaeffer, 1910 
 Zuphium mexicanum Chaudoir, 1863 
 Zuphium microphthalmum Putzeys, 1874 
 Zuphium modestum Schmidt-Goebel, 1846 
 Zuphium moorei Baehr, 1986 
 Zuphium numidicum Lucas, 1846 
 Zuphium obscurum Basilewsky, 1953 
 Zuphium olens (P.Rossi, 1790) 
 Zuphium orszuliki Hurka, 2001 
 Zuphium perrieri Fairmaire, 1899  
 Zuphium piceum Schmidt-Goebel, 1846 
 Zuphium ponticum K. & J.Daniel, 1898 
 Zuphium praestans Bates, 1892 
 Zuphium pseudamericanum Mateu, 1981 
 Zuphium punctipenne Bates, 1891 
 Zuphium pusillum Chaudoir, 1862 
 Zuphium rudolphi G.Muller, 1941 
 Zuphium ruficeps Apetz, 1854 
 Zuphium rufotinctum Fairmaire, 1901 
 Zuphium salivanum Liebke, 1933 
 Zuphium seyrigi Jeannel, 1949  
 Zuphium siamense Chaudoir, 1872 
 Zuphium syriacum Chaudoir, 1861 
 Zuphium tecospilum Basilewsky, 1948 
 Zuphium testaceum Klug, 1832 
 Zuphium thouzeti Laporte De Castelnau, 1867 
 Zuphium trigemme Andrewes, 1936 
 Zuphium trimaculatum Peringuey, 1899 
 Zuphium tschitscherini Jedlicka, 1963 
 Zuphium ustum Klug, 1834

References

Dryptinae